Plymouth is an unincorporated community in Benton County, Washington, United States. Plymouth is located on the Columbia River across from Umatilla, Oregon. It is south of the Tri-Cities and is served by Interstate 82.  It was named by early settlers who felt a nearby rock promontory resembled Plymouth Rock.

References

External links

Unincorporated communities in Benton County, Washington
Washington (state) populated places on the Columbia River
Unincorporated communities in Washington (state)